Martin Auerbach (born 3 November 2002) is a Hungarian football player. He plays as a goalkeeper for Csákvár on loan from Puskás Akadémia.

Club career
He made his NB I debut for Puskás Akadémia on 30 August 2020 in a game against Újpest.

References

External links
 
 
 

2002 births
People from Tatabánya
Living people
Hungarian footballers
Association football goalkeepers
Puskás Akadémia FC players
Csákvári TK players
Nemzeti Bajnokság I players
Nemzeti Bajnokság II players
Sportspeople from Komárom-Esztergom County
21st-century Hungarian people